The discography of The Ting Tings, an English indie pop duo, consists of three studio albums, three extended plays, 10 singles and 14 music videos. The Ting Tings were formed in 2004 in Salford, England by Jules De Martino and Katie White. The band was signed to independent record label Switchflicker Records in 2006 and released their limited-edition debut single, "Fruit Machine", the following year. Following an appearance at the Glastonbury Festival in 2007, The Ting Tings were signed to Columbia Records.

The Ting Tings released their debut album We Started Nothing in May 2008. The album peaked at number one on the UK Albums Chart and was certified platinum by the British Phonographic Industry (BPI). It also peaked at number 22 on the Australian albums chart and was certified gold by the Australian Recording Industry Association (ARIA). The group's third single, "That's Not My Name", topped the UK Singles Chart. The song peaked at number eight on the Australian Singles Chart and was certified gold by the ARIA. "Shut Up and Let Me Go", the album's fourth single, peaked at number one on the US Billboard Hot Dance Club Play chart and was certified platinum by the Recording Industry Association of America (RIAA).

The Ting Tings' second studio album, Sounds from Nowheresville, was less successful. It spent only two weeks on the UK Albums Chart peaking at number 23, and reached number 87 on the Billboard 200. In the UK, it generated one top 40 single, "Hands", which peaked at number 29.

The group's third studio album, Super Critical, was a commercial disappointment, not reaching the top 100 on the UK Albums chart and generating no charting singles in the UK. "Wrong Club", the album's lead single, did manage to chart in Japan however, where it reached number 45; it also reached number 53 in Belgium.

Studio albums

Extended plays

Singles

Other charted songs

Other appearances

Music videos

Notes

References

External links
 Official website
 The Ting Tings at AllMusic
 
 

Discographies of British artists
Rock music group discographies